The women's changquan competition at the 1994 Asian Games in Hiroshima, Japan was held from 12 to 14 October at the Aki Ward Sports Center.

Schedule

Results

References 

Wushu at the 1994 Asian Games